UPAEP may refer to:

Postal Union of the Americas, Spain and Portugal
Universidad Popular Autónoma del Estado de Puebla